John MacGregor (27 August 1885 - 14 July 1940) was a Scotland international rugby union player.

Rugby Union career

Amateur career

He played rugby union for Edinburgh University.

Provincial career

MacGregor played in the Inter-City match on 3 December 1910 for Edinburgh District against Glasgow District.

International career

References

Sources

 Bath, Richard (ed.) The Scotland Rugby Miscellany (Vision Sports Publishing Ltd, 2007 )

1885 births
1940 deaths
Scottish rugby union players
Scotland international rugby union players
Edinburgh University RFC players
Alumni of the University of Edinburgh
Rugby union players from Pontypridd
Edinburgh District (rugby union) players
Rugby union fly-halves